The Pack Saddle (1169 m.) is a high mountain pass in the Austrian Alps between the Lavant River valley in Carinthia and the Bundesland of Styria. It connects Pack & Preitenegg.

See also
 List of highest paved roads in Europe
 List of mountain passes

External links
Profile on climbbybike.com

Mountain passes of the Alps
Mountain passes of Styria
Mountain passes of Carinthia (state)